Robert Lowell Henderson (born 21 July 1961) is a Canadian politician, who was elected to the Legislative Assembly of Prince Edward Island in the 2007 provincial election. He represents the electoral district of O'Leary-Inverness and is a member of the Liberal Party. He is the son of the late former MP George Henderson.

In October 2011, Henderson was appointed to the Executive Council of Prince Edward Island as Minister of Tourism and Culture. Henderson continued to serve as Minister of Tourism when Wade MacLauchlan took over as premier in February 2015, but was left out when MacLauchlan shuffled the cabinet following the 2015 election. On January 7, 2016, Henderson returned to cabinet as Minister of Health and Wellness. On January 10, 2018, Henderson was moved to Minister of Agriculture and Fisheries.

References

External links
 Robert Henderson

Living people
Members of the Executive Council of Prince Edward Island
People from Prince County, Prince Edward Island
Prince Edward Island Liberal Party MLAs
21st-century Canadian politicians
1961 births